Tom Ducrocq (born 25 August 1999) is a French professional footballer who plays as a midfielder for Bastia, on loan from Ligue 1 club Lens.

Career
In May 2019, Ducrocq signed his first professional contract with RC Lens for three years. He made his professional debut with Lens in a 2–1 Coupe de la Ligue win over Troyes AC on 13 August 2019.

In 2020 Ducrocq moved to Bastia on a two-year loan. In July 2022, he joined the club for a third season, again on loan.

References

External links
 
 

Living people
1999 births
Footballers from Lille
French footballers
Association football midfielders
RC Lens players
SC Bastia players
Championnat National 2 players
Championnat National players
Ligue 2 players